Nommern is a commune and small town in central Luxembourg, in the canton of Mersch.

, the town of Nommern, which lies in the east of the commune, has a population of 262.  Other towns within the commune include Cruchten and Schrondweiler.

Population

References

External links
 

Communes in Mersch (canton)
Towns in Luxembourg